Beijing is one of the four direct-controlled municipalities of the People's Republic of China, and is divided into 16 districts.

Administrative divisions
All of these administrative divisions are explained in greater detail at Administrative divisions of the People's Republic of China. This chart lists only county-level divisions of Beijing.

Recent changes in administrative divisions

Historical divisions

ROC (1911–1949)

References 

Administrative divisions

Beijing